Chwalęcin  is a village in the administrative district of Gmina Niemcza, within Dzierżoniów County, Lower Silesian Voivodeship, in south-western Poland.

The village has a population of 70.

References

Villages in Dzierżoniów County